Little Shell Tribe of Chippewa Indians of Montana is a federally-recognized tribe of Ojibwe people in Montana. The name of the tribe is often shortened to Little Shell. The current population of enrolled tribal members is approximately 6,200.  They have a 35,000-sq. foot office complex in Great Falls.

Named for its 19th-century leader, Esens, known as "Little Shell". It was formerly known as the Little Shell Band of Landless Chippewa Indians of Montana because the Little Shell went without an Indian reservation, having conflicts with federal authorities dating back to the 19th century. Though considered “landless,” the tribe was state recognized in Montana for many years prior to federal recognition. The National Defense Authorization Act, which was signed into law on December 20, 2019, finally granted the Tribe Federal recognition. The tribe now owns 718 acres of land in and around Great Falls, Montana, and manages the Hell Creek Recreation Area.

Members elect a government of a chairman and Tribal Council according to their constitution. While headquartered in Great Falls, tribal members live throughout Montana, particularly in Havre, Lewistown, Helena, Butte, Chinook, Hays, Wolf Point, Hamilton, Billings.

History
During the early part of the 18th century, the ancestors of the Little Shell migrated from the Great Lakes area (most likely northern Ontario and northern Minnesota) into the Plains of Canada and the United States. They allied with the Assiniboine and Cree in a confederacy, driving out the Dakota and probably other tribes native to the areas now known as Alberta, Manitoba, and Ontario in Canada, and Minnesota and Montana in the United States.

The Little Shell are part of the historical Pembina Band of Chippewa Indians, first recorded by European settlers in documents of the Hudson's Bay Company at Fort Garry (Winnipeg) in the early 18th century. These logs and diaries show the Ojibwa people lived across approximately 63 million acres (250,000 km²) of land throughout what is now South Dakota, North Dakota and Canada. By the early 19th century, many French Canadian men, mostly fur trappers, had married into Ojibwe families.

The Pembina Band entered into a treaty with the United States in the 1863 Treaty of Old Crossing, together with the Red Lake Band of Chippewa. In 1864, the tribal leader, Esens, also known as Little Shell, walked out of further negotiations and refused to amend the original treaty. In 1892 he sent word to Washington D.C. that he would exchange 52 million acres (210,000 km²) of land and the treaty rights of 1863 for a large reservation, to include the entire Turtle Mountain area, at the price of $1.00 per acre of land.

Senator Porter J. McCumber of North Dakota was sent to meet with the Pembina Band. During the first meeting, when the senator was not present, his agent Waugh offered $0.10 per acre. The Pembina walked out of the meeting in disgust, knowing that the US had paid $1.00 per acre for less valuable land near Fort Berthold. Agent Waugh brought in 32 Ojibwe from Canada and had them sign the treaty, which became known as the McCumber Agreement or the Ten Cent Treaty.

After hearing of the fraud, John Burke, state attorney for Rolette County, North Dakota, agreed to represent Little Shell before the US Senate. Senator McCumber agreed with John Burke that the treaty was a fraud. Nonetheless, the US Senate ratified the treaty after McCumber died in 1905. The federal officials told the Little Shell people to sign the treaty or risk starving to death.

In the 1892 McCumber Agreement between the Turtle Mountain Indians and the Commission, the Turtle Mountain Indian Reservation was established, but many of the Little Shell Band of Chippewa Indians refused settlement there. Some Little Shell members did eventually settle on the Turtle Mountain Indian Reservation. Others migrated north and west into Saskatchewan and Alberta, and then later made their way back south into Montana.

In the mid-19th century, the tribe was numbered at several thousand in the Red River-Pembina region. At that time there was no formal enrollment procedure, no reservation, and thus no documented population.

20th and 21st century
Beginning in the late 20th century, the people of the tribe reorganized and first obtained state recognition In Montana in the late 1980s when Governor Stan Stephens signed authorizing legislation. The state recognition process formally incorporated the Little Shell Tribe of Chippewa Indians of Montana. They gained federal recognition in December 2019. Along the way, the Little Shell tribe opened a new cultural center in May 2014, located outside Great Falls, Montana.

Government
The Tribe maintained its integrity throughout the 20th century, long before federal recognition. The constitution has been revised, most recently in 2016. The government, social structure and culture have been maintained. The Little Shell Tribe is governed by a constitutionally defined elected Tribal Council. The Tribal Chairman is also elected. Four council seats are up for election every 4 years and three council seats every two years, in a largely mail-in balloting process. The tribal council meets regularly in Great Falls at least monthly, and quarterly meetings are held every quarter, in efforts to keep tribal members involved and informed.

The Council are unpaid. Now that the tribe federally recognized, the Little Shell qualify for federally funded educational or government support services such as housing and medical facilities, typically provided tribes recognized by the United States government. Little Shell Tribal members can obtain some services available in urban centers as well as public benefits available to all Montana residents.

Events of interest
 Joseph Dussome Day: An annual gathering of the tribe for cultural renaissance, social activities, election results, announcements and committee meetings, usually in November.
 Back to Batoche Celebration: An annual gathering of the Little Shell Tribe of Chippewa and sister Tribes of Metis in Canada, commemorating the Riel Rebellion, and including cultural activities, dancing, art and socializing, at Batoche, Saskatchewan.
 Little Shell Pow Wow: Annual tribal pow wow usually occurring in August in Great Falls, Montana.

Notable tribal members
 Thomas Little Shell

Further reading
A Brief Historical Overview Of The Little Shell Tribe of Pembina Chippewa, by Deward E. Walker, Jr., July 1990— This historical digest may be obtained from the Little Shell Tribal Offices in Great Falls.
The Free People—Otipemisiwak, by Diane Paulette Payment — This volume contains a detailed history of the Metifs, including cultural issues, early photographs, political action descriptions and other historical data, from a Canadian perspective.
Verne Dusenberry, "Waiting For A Day That Never Comes," Montana The Magazine of Western History. This article highlights the efforts of Joseph Dussome in organizing the tribe.
Nicholas Church Peterson Vrooman, compiler. "Buffalo Voices: Stories told by Metis and Little Shell Elders," Turtle Island 1492-1992, North Dakota Quarterly Vol 59 No. 4, Fall 1991
Nicholas C. P. Vrooman, The Whole Country was....One Robe: The Little Shell Tribe's America
Nicholas C. P. Vrooman, Plains/Chippewa/Metis Music from Turtle Mountain, Smithsonian/Folkways Recordings
Joseph Kinsey Howard, Strange Empire, Minnesota Historical Society, reprint 1994, with introduction by Nicholas Vrooman. History of the Métis, Canadian Métis, Little Shell Tribe, Turtle Mountain and Pembina and related groups.
Michael Loukinen, Medicine Fiddle (1992), film produced by Northern Michigan University. It features Metis and Chippewa music, dancing and spirituality. Also has interviews with musicians from several tribes and bands in the Western Great Lakes Red River area.
Levi, Sister M. Carolissa, CHIPPEWA INDIANS of Yesterday and Today(1956).
, an article in the Washington Post
Verne Dusenberry, "Waiting for a Day That Never Comes", Little Shell Tribe History, Little Shell Tribe Newsletter, hosted by Robert Dean Rudeseals The Little Shell Tribe of Montana

References

External links

Federally recognized tribes in the United States
Métis in the United States
Native American tribes in Montana
Ojibwe governments
Ojibwe in Montana